Bradfield Senior College (sometimes called Bradfield College) is a government-funded co-educational specialist senior secondary and vocational day school specialising in the creative industries, located on the Pacific Highway, St Leonards, New South Wales, in the lower north shore suburb of Sydney, New South Wales, Australia.  

Established in 1993, the college enrolled approximately 300 students in 2018, in Year 11 and Year 12 only, of whom one percent were Indigenous Australians. The school is operated by TAFE NSW in conjunction with the NSW Department of Education in accordance with a curriculum developed by the New South Wales Education Standards Authority. The principal is Meredith Melville-Jones, who also is the College Director of Bradfield College.

The related Bradfield College is one of seven colleges comprising TAFE NSW Northern Sydney.

History
Bradfield Senior College began in 1993 on the site previously occupied by North Sydney Girls High School. The College was the first of its kind in New South Wales to have TAFE NSW Certificate programs integrated with the NSW Higher School Certificate in areas such as Design, Music, Dance, Entertainment, Hospitality, Information Technology, Digital Media,  Retail and Tourism Services. The school caters for students in Years 11 and 12 only and boasts an independent adult environment for its students, some of whom have come from challenging backgrounds. The majority of students are aged 16 to 22 years old.

Campus
The Bradfield Senior College campus is located at 213 Pacific Highway on the St Leonards Learning and Innovation campus.

The school's facilities include a dance studio, music rehearsal rooms, recording studio, drama performance space, radio and editing rooms, darkroom, photography studio, visual art rooms, art exhibition studio, study centre, computer rooms (MAC and PC), food lab, biology lab, student lounge and design rooms.

Curriculum

Note: The TVET, External Dance and IT courses run one afternoon a week and are open to students who attend other schools if the school does not offer a particular subject.

Notable alumni
 Rose Byrneactress
 Alex KarbourisAustralian internationally renowned DJ/producer
 Darren McMullenAustralian VJ; works with MTV Australia

See also 

 List of government schools in New South Wales
 Education in Australia
 TAFE NSW

References

External links
 

Public high schools in Sydney
Educational institutions established in 1993
1993 establishments in Australia